Seiko Okamoto and Maki Arai were the defending champions, but both players chose not to participate.
Chan Chin-wei and Hsu Wen-hsin won the title, defeating Remi Tezuka and Akiko Yonemura 6–3, 6–4 in the final.

Seeds

Draw

Draw

References
 Main Draw
 Qualifying Draw

Kofu International Open - Doubles